Sigurd Heimdal Røsnes (”Ziggy”) is a Norwegian songwriter and producer. He has worked with artists such as Cher, Luis Fonsi, Cliff Richard, Ace of Base, BoA, Kumi Koda,  Namie Amuro,  E-Girls, L5, A-Teens, Ch!pz, Sharon Kips and Suzie McNeil. Sigurd Røsnes scored a #1 on Billboard´s Hot Dance Music with Cher's "A Different Kind of Love Song".

Partial discography

Cher
 "A Different Kind Of Love Song" (Michelle Lewis, Sigurd Røsnes, Johan Åberg) from the album Living Proof &  The Very Best of Cher No#1 Billboard´s Hot Dance Music

Cliff Richard
 "Everything That I Am" (Tom Nichols, Sigurd Rösnes, Martin Sjølie) from the album Rise Up #4 UK Albums

Luis Fons]
 "Keep My Cool" ("Fuera de Control") (Sigurd Røsnes, Johan Åberg, Allan Rich, Clyde Lieberman) from the album Amor Secreto #1 Billboard Top Latin Albums

E-Girls
 "Pink Champagne" (Sigurd Røsnes, Nemin Harambasic, Courtney Woolsey, Stephen Stahl, Rie Fujioka, Dominique Rodriguez) #1 Oricon Singles Chart (2016)

Namie Amuro
 "Black Make-Up" (Sigurd Røsnes, Andreas Öberg, Xin Xin Gao) B-Side from the single "Red Carpet" #2 Oricon Chart Japan (2015) (Produced by Sigurd Rösnes)

Kumi Koda
 "Dance In the Rain" (Ziggy, Koda Kumi, Her0ism, Melanie Fontana) from the album Walk of My Life #1 Oricon Chart Japan (2015)

Nádine
 "Made Up My Mind" (Ziggy, Lindy Robbins, Manic) 1st single from the album This Time I Know

BoA
 "No. 1" (Ziggy) from the album No. 1
 "Spark2" (Sigurd Røsnes, Johan Åberg, Allan Rich, Clyde Lieberman) from the album 'My Name
 "Touch" (Røsnes, Manic, Djuström, Jonsson) from the album Summer SMTown

A-Teens
 "Rockin" (Røsnes, Pettersen, Eikemo) from the album Teen Spirit

L5 (band)
 "Toutes Les Femmes De Ta Vie" (Steinberg, Røsnes, Åberg, Maïdi Roth, Doriand) from the album L5
 "Plaisir Extensible" (Ziggy, Åberg, Sandén, Lydy Louisy Joseph) from the album Turbulences

Suzie McNeil
 "Broken & Beautiful" (Michelle Lewis, Sigurd Røsnes, Johan Åberg) from the album Broken & Beautiful

Joy Williams (singer)
 "Touch of Fatel (Ty Lacy, Sigurd Røsnes, Johan Åberg) from the album Joy Williams

Sharon Kips
 "Heartbreak Away" (Ziggy, Marjorie Maye, Nick Manic) 1st single from the album 10 #1 Holland Single Chart

Ch!pz
 "Captain Hook" (Røsnes, Jaxx, Manic) -3:14 from the album Adventures Of Ch!pz
 "Christmas Time Is Here" (Røsnes, T.Nichols, Manic) from the album Past:Present:Future
 "High School Love" (Røsnes, Jaxx, Manic) from the album Past:Present:Future
 "1929" (Røsnes,Manic) from the album Past:Present:Future
 "Rockstar" (Røsnes, Jaxx, Manic) -3:10 from the album The World Of Ch!pz
 "The Biggest Show On Earth" (Røsnes,Manic) from the album The H!ts Collection

References
http://www.sigurdrosnes.com/

External links
[]

- v=onepage&q=&f=false

Year of birth missing (living people)
Living people
Discographies of Norwegian artists
Norwegian musicians
Place of birth missing (living people)